The Licensing Act 1988 is a statute, applying to England and Wales, which among other things, extended permissible opening hours for public houses to 11am to 11pm.  Previously pubs were not generally allowed to open between 3:00pm and 5:30pm.

See also
 Licensing Act 1872
 Licensing Act 2003

External links

1988 in law
United Kingdom Acts of Parliament 1988
Alcohol law in the United Kingdom
Repealed United Kingdom Acts of Parliament